is a Japanese former Nippon Professional Baseball pitcher.

References 

1971 births
Living people
Baseball people from Osaka Prefecture
Japanese baseball players
Nippon Professional Baseball pitchers
Nippon Ham Fighters players
Hokkaido Nippon-Ham Fighters players